The Glaciated Allegheny Plateau is that portion of the Allegheny Plateau that lies within the area covered by the last glaciation.  As a result, this area of the Allegheny Plateau has lower relief and gentler slopes than the relatively rugged Unglaciated Allegheny Plateau.  In general, the glaciated lies to the north and west of the unglaciated, and forms an arc in northeastern to southeastern Ohio lying between the glacial till plains and the Unglaciated Allegheny Plateau. The Glaciated Allegheny Plateau extends into a belt of southern  New York State and the central Susquehanna River basin.

A small area of the Allegheny Plateau was glaciated during the Wisconsin Stage, the late Illinoian Stage, and Pre-Illinoian B and G glaciations of the Pre-Illinoian Stage. This areaonly a few hundred square kilometers owing to the blockage the steep relief of the mountains provides at the edge of the ice sheetcontains only old drift now buried by long periods of soil development.

The major cities on the Glaciated Allegheny Plateau are Pittsburgh, Akron and Youngstown.

References

External links
Fleeger, G., nd, Glacial geology of Pennsylvania Bureau of Topographic and Geologic Survey, Pennsylvania Department of Conservation and Natural Resources, Harrisburg, Pennsylvania.
Sevon, W.D., and D.D. Braun, 1997, Glacial Deposits of Pennsylvania. PDF version, 660 KB Map no. 59. Pennsylvania Geological Survey, Harrisburg, Pennsylvania.
Sevon, W.D. G.M. Fleeger, and V.C. Shepps, 1999, Pennsylvania and the Ice Age. PDF version, 3.9 MB Educational Series no. 6. Pennsylvania Geological Survey, Harrisburg, Pennsylvania.
Shepps, V.C., G.W. White, J.B. Droste, and R.F. Sitler, 1959, Glacial Geology of Northwestern Pennsylvania. Bulletin no. G32. Bureau of Topographic and Geologic Survey, Pennsylvania Department of Conservation and Natural Resources, Harrisburg, Pennsylvania. (Note: having been published in 1959, this reference uses the now obsolete and abandoned classic, Nebraskan, Kansan, and so forth, Midwest glacial terminology.)

Allegheny Plateau, Unglaciated
Allegheny Plateau, Unglaciated
Allegheny Plateau, Unglaciated